Franc Očko (born 31 March 1960) is a Slovenian judoka. He competed at the 1980 Summer Olympics and the 1984 Summer Olympics, representing Yugoslavia.

References

1960 births
Living people
Slovenian male judoka
Olympic judoka of Yugoslavia
Judoka at the 1980 Summer Olympics
Judoka at the 1984 Summer Olympics
People from Slovenska Bistrica